Marko Cuderman (born 11 August 1960) is a Yugoslav former cyclist. He competed in the individual road race event at the 1984 Summer Olympics.

References

External links
 

1960 births
Living people
Yugoslav male cyclists
Olympic cyclists of Yugoslavia
Cyclists at the 1984 Summer Olympics
Sportspeople from Kranj